Allothereua bidenticulata is a species of centipede in the Scutigeridae family. It is endemic to Australia. It was first described in 1925 by German myriapodologist Karl Wilhelm Verhoeff.

Distribution
The species occurs in Queensland, New South Wales, Victoria and south-west Western Australia. The type locality is Glen Lamington, in the Scenic Rim Region of south-eastern Queensland.

Subspecies
 Allothereua bidenticulata linderi Fahlander, 1939
 Allothereua bidenticulata vittata Verhoeff, 1925
 Allothereua bidenticulata bidenticulata Verhoeff, 1925

Behaviour
The centipedes are solitary terrestrial predators that inhabit plant litter and soil.

References

 

 
bidenticulata
Centipedes of Australia
Endemic fauna of Australia
Fauna of New South Wales
Fauna of Queensland
Fauna of Victoria (Australia)
Fauna of Western Australia
Animals described in 1925
Taxa named by Karl Wilhelm Verhoeff